Song Zhiguang (1916–2005) was a Chinese diplomat. He was born in Panyu District, Guangzhou, Guangdong. He was Ambassador of the People's Republic of China to the East Germany (1970–1972), United Kingdom (1972–1977) and Japan (1982–1985).

1916 births
2005 deaths
Ambassadors of China to East Germany
Ambassadors of China to the United Kingdom
Ambassadors of China to Japan
People from Panyu District